Susan Petronella Thomas, Baroness Thomas of Walliswood,  (born 20 December 1935) is a British businesswoman and Liberal Democrat politician.

Early life and education
She is the daughter of John Arrow and Ebba Fordham. She was educated at Cranborne Chase School and Lady Margaret Hall, Oxford, where she graduated with a Bachelor of Arts in history in 1957.

Career
Thomas worked for the National Economic Development Office from 1971 to 1974 and was chief executive of the Council of Europe of the British Clothing Industries from 1974 to 1978. Between 1985 and 1994, she was a school governor.

She contested Mole Valley for the SDP-Liberal Alliance in the 1983 and 1987 general elections and Surrey for the Liberal Democrats in the 1994 European Parliament election, but failed to be elected.

Honours
In the 1989 Queen's Birthday Honours, she was made an Officer of the Order of the British Empire (OBE).  Thomas was appointed in January 1996 a Deputy Lieutenant of Surrey.

On 6 October 1994, she was created a life peer as Baroness Thomas of Walliswood, of Dorking in the County of Surrey. She sat in the House of Lords until 18 May 2016, at which point she ceased to be a member pursuant to section 2 of the House of Lords Reform Act 2014, having failed to attend during the whole of the 2015–16 session without being on leave of absence.

Family
In 1958, she had married David Churchill Thomas. They have three daughters, including the author Tom Cain.

References

External links
Baroness Thomas of Walliswood profile at the site of Liberal Democrats

1935 births
Alumni of Lady Margaret Hall, Oxford
Deputy Lieutenants of Surrey
Life peeresses created by Elizabeth II
Thomas of Walliswood 
Liberal Party (UK) parliamentary candidates
Living people
Officers of the Order of the British Empire